Rufoplaca is a genus of lichen-forming fungi in the family Teloschistaceae. The genus was circumscribed in 2013 by Ulf Arup, Ulrik Søchting, and Patrik Frödén.

Species
Rufoplaca aesanensis 
Rufoplaca arenaria 
Rufoplaca germanica 
Rufoplaca kaernefeltiana 
Rufoplaca oxfordensis 
Rufoplaca scotoplaca 
Rufoplaca subpallida 
Rufoplaca toktoana 
Rufoplaca tristiuscula 
Rufoplaca ulleungensis

References

Teloschistales
Teloschistales genera
Taxa described in 2013